Doordarshan Kendra Madurai was inaugurated on 15 August 2005. The service has been extended to the entire state in phased manner by installing Terrestrial Transmitters of different capacities (HPTs, LPTs, VLPTs) at different parts of the state.

The local (DD Madurai) service caters to the needs of the populace living in the areas falling within the reach of a particular transmitter through area specific programmes in the local languages and dialects.

DD Madurai presents a program by Sri Velakkudi Krishnan, about the meanings of Bhagavadh Gita. This narrowcast at 6.30 am and 6.30 PM also in DD Chennai, Podhigai TV.

DD Madurai is in Southern Tamil Nadu and also used for narrowcasting for the benefit of Farmers and general public in and around Madurai district.

Technology

List of programs

Others

See also
 List of programs broadcast by DD National
 All India Radio
 Ministry of Information and Broadcasting
 DD Direct Plus
 List of South Asian television channels by country
 Media in Chennai
 Media in Coimbatore

External links 
 Official website
 Doordarshan Official Internet site
 Doordarshan news site
 An article at PFC

DD Madurai
Foreign television channels broadcasting in the United Kingdom
Television channels and stations established in 1976
Indian direct broadcast satellite services
Mass media in Madurai
Buildings and structures in Madurai
Tamil-language television channels